The Immortal Irishman: The Irish Revolutionary Who Became an American Hero is a 2016 non-fiction book by American author Timothy Egan. The books details the life and times of Thomas Francis Meagher, from his rise as a public speaker during the Great Hunger, his time in Tasmania, his leadership of the Irish Brigade during the American Civil War, and his final adventure to Montana.

The book received a positive review in the Boston Globe while it was criticized in a review in the Washington Post.

References

External links
Presentation by Egan on The Immortal Irishman, March 13, 2016

2016 non-fiction books
American biographies
History books about Australia
History books about Ireland
Houghton Mifflin books